Arthur W. Hodes (November 14, 1904 – March 4, 1993), was a Russian Empire-born American jazz and blues pianist. He is regarded by many critics as the greatest white blues pianist.

Biography

Hodes was born in Mykolaiv, in present-day Ukraine. His family settled in Chicago, Illinois, when he was a few months old. His career began in Chicago clubs, but he did not gain wider attention until moving to New York City in 1938. In New York, he played with Sidney Bechet, Joe Marsala, and Mezz Mezzrow.

Later, Hodes founded his own band in the 1940s and it would be associated with his hometown of Chicago. He and his band played mostly in that area for the next forty years. In the late 1960s, Hodes starred in a series of TV shows on Chicago style jazz called Jazz Alley, where he appeared with musicians such as Pee Wee Russell and Jimmy McPartland. Episodes of the show have been released on DVD.

Hodes was editor of the magazine, The Jazz Record, for five years in the 1940s.

He remained an educator and writer in jazz. During this period of his life and into the 1970s, Hodes resided in south suburban Park Forest, Illinois.

He toured the UK in 1987, recording with drummer John Petters. In 1988, he visited Ireland to appear at the Cork Jazz Festival with Petters and Wild Bill Davison. A tour, the Legends of American Dixieland, followed in May 1989 with the same line-up.

Other musicians he played and recorded with included Louis Armstrong, Wingy Manone, Gene Krupa, Muggsy Spanier, Joe Marsala, Mezz Mezzrow, Sidney Bechet, Kenny Davern,  Albert Nicholas, Wild Bill Davison, Barney Bigard, and Vic Dickenson.

In 1998, he was inducted into the Big Band and Jazz Hall of Fame.

Ethan Iverson wrote an article on Hodes, "Selections from the Gutter", which includes a transcription of Hodes's first 78, "Ross Tavern Boogie".

Hodes died in March 1993, in Harvey, Illinois, at the age of 88.

Quotation

Discography

As leader/co-leader

Compilations
 Vintage Art Hodes (Jazzology, 1930–50)
 Sessions at Blue Note (1944)
 The Jazz Record Story (Jazzology, 1943–46)
 The Duets (Solo Art, 1969–77)
 The Parkwood Creative Concept Sessions, Volume I (Parkwood, 1987–89)

References

External links
 Selections From the Gutter (Art Hodes) "Selections from the Gutter," article by Ethan Iverson

1904 births
1993 deaths
Jazz musicians from Illinois
Musicians from Chicago
20th-century American pianists
20th-century American male musicians
American jazz pianists
American male pianists
American male jazz musicians
Emigrants from the Russian Empire to the United States
Blue Note Records artists
Candid Records artists
Delmark Records artists
Muse Records artists
Sackville Records artists
Jazzology Records artists
Mercury Records artists